Stade Municipal is a stadium in Oberkorn, Luxembourg. It has a capacity of 10,000 spectators.  It is the home of CS Oberkorn.

References

Football venues in Luxembourg
Sports venues in Differdange